Johannes Sophus Gelert (1852-1923) was a Danish-born sculptor, who came to the United States in 1887 and during a span of more than thirty years produced numerous works of civic art in the Midwest and on the East Coast.

Biography
Johannes Gelert was born December 10, 1852 in the town of Nybøl in southern Denmark.  He demonstrated an early talent for art and after moving with his family to Copenhagen in 1866 was apprenticed to a woodcarver. In 1870 he enrolled in the Royal Danish Academy of Fine Arts, where he graduated with honors in 1875.  For the next ten years he worked and studied in Denmark, Sweden, Germany, France and Italy, becoming a protégé of some of Europe's leading sculptors.

Immigrating to America in 1887, Gelert established his studios in Chicago. He became a citizen of the United States in 1892 and four years later married Georgine Sundberg, with whom he had three children. He moved his studios to New York City in 1898  and lived there until his death on 
November 3, 1923.

Exhibitions and awards
Gelert exhibited his sculpture at several notable events: the 1893 World's Columbian Exposition in Chicago, the 1901 Pan-American Exposition in Buffalo, the 1904 Louisiana Purchase Exposition in St. Louis and the 1915 Panama–Pacific International Exposition in San Francisco.

A three-time gold medal winner, he received top honors for "Wounded American Soldier" at the 1897 Tennessee Centennial and International Exposition in Nashville,  "Little Architect" at the 1899 Exhibition of the Art Club of Philadelphia and "Theseus, Victor over the Minotaur" at the 1902 Exhibition of the American Art Society in Philadelphia.

Public displays of his art
In 1890 Gelert created a bronze statue of President Ulysses S. Grant. That statue was financed and commissioned by Chicago Time-Herald publisher, Herman H. Kohlsaat. Gelert had moved to New York at the time of his commission. Gelert's statue of Grant was displayed and dedicated at Grant Park in Galena Illinois on June 3, 1891. Grant is displayed as a citizen standing having his right hand in his pocket. Gelert told city officials that the statue was to depict Grant as a private citizen of Galena "as you knew him..." Grant's widow, Julia Grant, was critical of Grant holding his hand in his pocket, but she approved the final version of the statue.

Johannes Gelert's 1912 statue of John H. Stevens, an early settler in Minneapolis, was based on drawings by the Norwegian-born sculptor Jacob Fjelde. Originally located in downtown Minneapolis, it was later moved to one of the city's most popular parks. Other works by Gelert are found at frequently visited attractions throughout the country: the Brooklyn Museum, Chicago's Auditorium Theatre and Lincoln Park and the St. Louis Art Museum. He also designed 
the tomb of businessman Francis Furman, which is the largest memorial at Mount Olivet Cemetery in Nashville.

There is, however, limited public access to one of his best-known pieces. Gelert's Haymarket Memorial, showing a Chicago policeman with an upraised arm, was unveiled in Haymarket Square on May 30, 1889.  After being struck by a streetcar, defaced with black paint and targeted with bomb attacks during the Vietnam War, it was moved to the headquarters of the Chicago Police Department in the early 1970s, where it has remained in secure locations ever since.

Historians and scholars note that Gelert's works displayed contemporary and interesting themes of economic class, labor, and social movements.

Lost works

After major fire damage in 1890, McVicker's Theatre in Chicago was redesigned by the architectural firm of Adler and Sullivan. Johannes Gelert contributed two panels in bas-relief: "one depicting the march of LaSalle, which was the entrance of Christianity into Illinois, the other symbolizing in a picture of the Fort Dearborn massacre the final struggle of savagery to hold its own against the new civilization of the State." Dating from 1872, the building was demolished in 1922 to make way for the third version of McVicker's Theatre, a movie palace that lasted until 1984 and was taken down the following year.

A bronze bust of Beethoven, created by Gelert in 1897, stood in Lincoln Park for over seventy years.  Stolen in 1971, a fragment of the base remains.

In 1899 Gelert was one of twenty-eight sculptors working on the Dewey Arch, which honored Admiral George Dewey and his victory in the Battle of Manila Bay the previous year. The monument, erected for a parade on September 30, 1899, was made of staff, a material often used for temporary structures at international fairs and expositions. Soon after the celebration the arch began to deteriorate.  When funds could not be raised to remake it with durable materials, the arch was destroyed.

See also
Haymarket memorials

Gallery

References

External links

Articles
The Wounded Soldier in the San Francisco Call: February 26, 1899. 
Johannes Gelert in the New York Times: December 11, 1922.
Books
Johannes Gelert in the Lincoln Financial Foundation Collection
Graphic historical sketch of McVicker's Theatre published in 1891
Johannes Gelert in 1917-1918 issue of New Jersey's First Citizens, pp. 206–207.
Johannes Gelert in the 1899 National Cyclopaedia of American Biography, pp. 58–59.
Profiles
Johannes Gelert 
Chicago Herald Building 1891
Chicago Herald statue by Gelert
Herald Building at 165 W. Washington Street 
McVicker's Theatre in Chicago 1891
McVicker's Theatre
Auditorium of McVicker's Theatre
Bas-reliefs at McVicker's Theatre
La Salle's Triumphant March Through Illinois
The Fort Dearborn Massacre
Andersen statue at Lincoln Park 1896
The Hans Christian Andersen Statue  in Skandinaven: September 17, 1896.
Beethoven bust at Lincoln Park 1897
Beethoven bust unveiled
A missing monument
Dewey Arch in New York City 1899
The Dewey Arch 
Bas-relief on Dewey Arch
Art and Artists (Destruction of Dewey Arch) 
Gold Medals
Wounded American Soldier: Nashville 1897
Little Architect: Philadelphia 1899
Theseus, Victor over the Minotaur: Philadelphia 1902
Catalogs
Johannes Gelert at the Smithsonian Institution.
Johannes Gelert at the Brooklyn Museum.
Selected works by Johannes Gelert
1885 St. Augustine at Frederik's Church in Copenhagen. 
1889 Haymarket Memorial at police headquarters in Chicago.
1889 Portrait medallions of Demosthenes and William Shakespeare at the Auditorium Theatre in Chicago.
1889 Portrait medallions of Richard Wagner and Joseph Haydn at the Auditorium Theatre in Chicago.
1890 Ulysses S. Grant in Galena, Illinois.
1891 The Chicago Herald at St. Ignatius High School.
1893 The Struggle for Work at the Chicago World's Fair.
1895 Abraham Lincoln
1896 Hans Christian Andersen at Lincoln Park in Chicago.
1897 Beethoven bust at Lincoln Park in Chicago.
1897 Wounded American Soldier: gold medal recipient at the Tennessee Centennial in Nashville.
1899 Little Architect: gold medal recipient at the Art Club of Philadelphia exhibition.
1899 Dewey Arch in New York City.
1899 Justice Joseph Mead Bailey at the Chicago-Kent College of Law.
1904 Napoleon at the St. Louis World's Fair.
1904 Gothic art at the St. Louis World's Fair.
1904 Gothic art at the St. Louis Art Museum.
1905 Denmark at the U. S. Custom House in New York City.
1908 Francis Furman statue at Vanderbilt University in Nashville.
1908 Francis Furman mausoleum at Mount Olivet Cemetery in Nashville.
1909 Roman emperor at the Brooklyn Museum.
1909 Roman law at the Brooklyn Museum. 
1909 Roman orator at the Brooklyn Museum. 
1909 Roman statesman at the Brooklyn Museum. 
1911 Enlightenment giving power atop the Bergen County Court House in Hackensack, New Jersey.
1912 John H. Stevens at Minnehaha Park in Minneapolis.
1913 Evening prayers at Christ Lutheran Church in Maplewood, New Jersey.
1916 C. W. Post in Battle Creek, Michigan.

1852 births
1923 deaths
Danish-American history
People from Sønderborg Municipality
Danish emigrants to the United States
Danish migration to North America
Danish sculptors
Danish male artists
20th-century American sculptors
20th-century American male artists
19th-century American sculptors
19th-century American male artists
American male sculptors
Male sculptors